Adniellyson da Silva Oliveira (born 7 September 1995), simply known as Silva, is a Brazilian footballer who plays for Swiss club Yverdon as midfielder.

Club career
On 24 June 2021, he joined Yverdon in Swiss Challenge League on loan. On 11 July 2022, Silva returned to Yverdon on a permanent basis and signed a three-year contract.

Career statistics

References

1995 births
Sportspeople from Maranhão
Living people
Brazilian footballers
Association football midfielders
Sport Club Internacional players
Atlético Clube Goianiense players
Sampaio Corrêa Futebol Clube players
Clube Atlético Tubarão players
Boa Esporte Clube players
FC Chiasso players
FC Sion players
Yverdon-Sport FC players
Campeonato Brasileiro Série A players
Campeonato Brasileiro Série B players
Campeonato Brasileiro Série D players
Swiss Challenge League players
Brazilian expatriate footballers
Expatriate footballers in Switzerland
Brazilian expatriate sportspeople in Switzerland